Lithophaga antillarum, or the Giant date mussel, is a species of bivalve mollusc in the family Mytilidae. It can be found along the Atlantic coast of North America, ranging from southern Florida to the West Indies and Brazil.

References

antillarum
Bivalves described in 1842